Erriseask House is a defunct restaurant and hotel in Ballyconneely, County Galway, Ireland. It was a fine dining restaurant that was awarded one Michelin star both in 2000 and 2001.

The hotel was owned by the brothers Matz, who sold the hotel in 2002. Stefan Matz was the head chef.

The hotel reopened in 2015 as the Connemara Sands Hotel, with Stefan Matz as Executive Head Chef.

See also
List of Michelin starred restaurants in Ireland

References

Restaurants in the Republic of Ireland
Michelin Guide starred restaurants in Ireland
Buildings and structures in County Galway
Defunct restaurants in Ireland
Restaurants established in 1989
Hotels established in 1989
2002 disestablishments in Ireland
Restaurants disestablished in 2002